Bifrenaria atropurpurea is a species of orchid and the type species of the genus Bifrenaria.

References

External links 

atropurpurea